Cihuatán is a major pre-Columbian archaeological site in central El Salvador. It was a very large city located in the extreme south of the Mesoamerican cultural area, and has been dated to the Early Postclassic period of Mesoamerican chronology (c. 950–1200 AD).

Archaeological investigation of the site was undertaken in the mid to late 1970s by Karen Olsen Bruhns of San Francisco State University in conjunction with El Salvador's Administración de Patrimonio Cultural (Cultural Heritage Administration). By 1980,  of the city had been mapped by the archaeological project, covering an area that included over 900 structures.

Location

Cihuatán is situated in the municipality of Aguilares, in the department of San Salvador, in central El Salvador.

Site history
Cihuatán was apparently established in the 8th or 9th century AD on a previously uninhabited site, and occupation was relatively brief, not lasting more than a century or so. The founding of the city coincides with the abandonment of major Classic period cities in the surrounding region, which had strong links to the Maya cities of Honduras. The founding of Cihuatán may have been a by-product of the disruption caused by the Classic Maya collapse and corresponding shift in trade routes. Although the ethnic identity of the site elite is unknown, the architectural style of the structures outside of the ceremonial core of the city is recognisably Maya. About 100 to 150 years after it was founded, Cihuatán was destroyed by a massive fire that spread rapidly throughout the city. Excavated evidence indicates that those inhabitants that did not die in the flames fled, abandoning their belongings. Spear points were frequent finds in the burnt layers and human remains were found trapped in drains in the acropolis that dated to the time of the city's destruction.

Artifacts
Ceramics excavated at Cihuatán include large locally-produced ceramic effigies of central Mexican deities such as Tlaloc and Xipe Totec, and are very similar in style to effigies recovered from Central Mexico and the Gulf coast. Locally-produced utilitarian ceramics are of a type common to the southern Mesoamerican region during the Early Postclassic. Other ceramics include spiked incense burners, small anthropomorphic figurines, wheeled figurines, and clay boxes. Both locally-produced and imported ceramics appear to have close affinities with ceramic styles from Veracruz, on the Gulf coast of Mexico, and may have derived from them, although they are combined with strong local influences. Large quantities of obsidian artefacts were found at Cihuatán, in both residential and ceremonial contexts. These included obsidian cores, prismatic blades, and tools. Bifacial projectile points were also recovered, but were uncommon. These stone artefacts were typical of the Early Postclassic period.

Site description

Cihuatán was a very large Mesoamerican city. The city possessed two principal ceremonial centres, known respectively as the Eastern and Western Ceremonial Centres. In 1978 the Western Ceremonial Centre was cleared of vegetation and mapped. Excavations included a cluster of residential buildings that had been hastily abandoned due to fire, resulting in many of the household goods being preserved when the walls collapsed. The ceremonial architecture of the site core is of a pan-Mesoamerican style; outside of the ceremonial groups, the style is distinctively Maya.

The Western Ceremonial Centre includes a large pyramid, a number of west-facing platforms that originally supported superstructures, and two -shaped Mesoamerican ballcourts. The excavator judged that the architectural styles of the Western Ceremonial Centre demonstrated the influence of Veracruz architectural styles. Radiocarbon dating suggests that the Western Ceremonial Centre was first built during the 8th or early-9th century AD.

The Eastern Ceremonial Centre is contemporary with the Western Ceremonial Centre, but is architecturally distinct in both plan and style.

It consisted of two houses and two smaller structures, and their courtyards. The smaller structures may have been used to store maize. This group of buildings was abandoned due to fire, and many household objects were recovered in situ, including large food storage jars, cooking pots, and decorated ceramics. Evidence for the manufacture of obsidian tools was excavated, and for the spinning of cotton.

P16 was a large structure situated on the West Terrace, in the centre of what was likely to have been the main marketplace in the city. Its construction style was similar to that of residential buildings, but it is likely to have served a specialist purpose. It had been burned, and contained ordinary domestic refuse. The south end of the building consisted of a very large workshop dedicated to the manufacture of obsidian woodworking tools.

P22 was a small ceremonial platform located to the northwest of the Western Ceremonial Centre. It is badly preserved but was rectangular in form, with its entrance stairway on the west side.

Notes

References

Amaroli, Paul; and Fabio E. Amador (2003) "Los Límites de Cihuatán: Reconocimiento arqueológico para determinar la extensión de la antigua ciudad". San Salvador, El Salvador: Fundación Nacional de Arqueología de El Salvador. Retrieved on 11 April 2016.
Amaroli B., Paúl E.; and Olsen Bruhns, Karen (2013) "450 Years Too Soon: Mixteca-Puebla Style Polychrome Ceramics in El Salvador". Anales del Instituto Investigaciones Estéticas [online], Vol. 35, No. 103, pp. 231–249. Mexico City, Mexico: Universidad Autónoma de México. . Retrieved on 11 April 2016.
Bruhns, Karen Olsen (1980) "Investigations at Cihuatan: An Early Postclassic Town of El Salvador" Mexicon, Vol. 2, No. 1 (18 March 1980), pp. 6–8. . 
Proyecto Arqueológico Cihuatán "Cihuatán: El Salvador's Ancient City" (San Francisco, California, US and San Salvador, El Salvador: San Francisco State University, with the Secrataría de Cultura and Fundación Nacional de Arqueología). Retrieved on 7 April 2016.

Further reading

Bruhns, Karen Olsen, and Paul Amaroli B. (2012) The Archaeology of Cihuatan, El Salvador: An Early Postclassic Maya City. Lap Lambert Academic Publishing. .
Cobos, Rafael (1998) [1994]. Síntesis de la Arqueología de El Salvador 1850–1991. Colección Antropología e Historia (no.21) (in Spanish). San Salvador, El Salvador: CONCULTURA (Consejo Nacional para la Cultura y el Arte). 
Fowler, William R.; Jane H. Kelley, Frank Asaro, Helen V. Michel and Fred H. Stross (January 1987) "The Chipped Stone Industry of Cihuatan and Santa Maria, El Salvador, and Sources of Obsidian from Cihuatan", American Antiquity, Vol. 52, No. 1 (January 1987), pp. 151–160. Society for American Archaeology. . . 

Archaeological sites in El Salvador
Mesoamerican sites
Maya sites in El Salvador
Former populated places in El Salvador
San Salvador Department
Maya Postclassic Period